Artworks called Point of View include:
 Point of View (Passmore)
 Point of View (Stephan), Salt Lake City, Utah, U.S.